Geoff Lyon (birth unknown – death unknown) was an English professional rugby league footballer who played as a  for Wigan and Leigh, and made one representative appearance for Lancashire. His son, David Lyon was also a professional rugby league footballer.

Playing career

Challenge Cup Final appearances
Geoff Lyon was an unused interchange/substitute, i.e. number 15, in Wigan's 20-16 victory over Hunslet in the 1965 Challenge Cup Final during the 1964–65 season at Wembley Stadium, London on Saturday 8 May 1965, in front of a crowd of 89,016.

County Cup Final appearances
Geoff Lyon was an interchange/substitute, i.e. number 14, in Wigan's 7-4 victory over St. Helens in the 1968 BBC2 Floodlit Trophy Final during the 1968–69 season at Central Park, Wigan on Tuesday 17 December 1968, played left-, i.e. number 11, in Wigan's 16-13 victory over Oldham in the 1966 Lancashire County Cup Final during the 1966–67 season at Station Road, Swinton on Saturday 29 October 1966, and played right-, i.e. number 12, in Leigh's 2-11 defeat by Swinton in the 1969 Lancashire County Cup Final during the 1969–70 season at Central Park, Wigan on Saturday 1 November 1969.

BBC2 Floodlit Trophy Final appearances
Geoff Lyon played  in Leigh's 11-6 victory over Wigan in the 1969 BBC2 Floodlit Trophy Final during the 1969–70 season at Central Park, Wigan on Tuesday 16 December 1969.

References

External links
Statistics at wigan.rlfans.com
Coaching profile at Rugby League Project

2004 deaths
Blackpool Borough coaches
English rugby league players
Lancashire rugby league team players
Leigh Leopards players
Place of birth missing
Place of death missing
Rugby league second-rows
Wigan Warriors players
Year of birth missing